Oxyurichthys heisei, commonly known as the ribbon goby, is a species of goby is found in the eastern central Pacific (Hawaii).

References

heisei
Fish of the Pacific Ocean
Taxa named by Frank Lorenzo Pezold III
Fish described in 1998